The 1936 Manitoba general election was held July 27, 1936 to elect Members of the Legislative Assembly of the Province of Manitoba, Canada. The Liberal-Progressives won minority government in this election, taking 23 seats out of 53 and 35 percent of the vote.

This was the second election in Manitoba after the formation of a Liberal-Progressive alliance in 1932.  The Progressive Party, which had governed the province since 1922, forged an alliance with the Liberal Party just prior to the 1932 provincial election to prevent the Conservative Party from winning.  This alliance won the 1932 election under Premier John Bracken's leadership, and the two parties had effectively become united by 1936.

The Liberal-Progressives faced opposition from a variety of parties in the 1936 election.  The Conservative Party remained the dominant opposition group, and the most serious challenge to the government.  On the left, the Independent Labour Party (ILP) formed an alliance with the national Co-operative Commonwealth Federation (CCF), and contested the election as the ILP-CCF.  The Communist Party also fielded a strong candidate in Winnipeg, while the upstart Social Credit League also ran candidates, hoping to repeat William Aberhart's surprising victory in Alberta the previous year.

Despite economic hardships in the province, Bracken expected that his government would be returned with another majority.  He was mistaken.  Although the Liberal-Progressives won the election, they could claim only twenty-two seats out of 53 after the initial results were declared.  The Conservative party, under its new leader, former federal Member of Parliament (MP) Errick Willis, finished a close second with sixteen.  The ILP-CCF won seven seats, while the Social Credit League unexpectedly won five.  One independent Liberal was also elected.  A number of rural ridings, which had previously supported Liberal-Progressive candidates, shifted to the Conservatives or to Social Credit in this poll.

The greatest surprise of the election occurred in the Winnipeg constituency, which elected ten members via a single transferable ballot.  Former judge Lewis Stubbs, an independent leftist, received an astounding 24,805 votes on the first ballot, almost 20,000 more than his nearest competitor.  The second-place candidate, moreover, was James Litterick, the first openly declared communist to win election at the state or federal level in North America.

After the election, Bracken attempted to persuade Errick Willis to form a four-year alliance of the Liberal-Progressive and Conservative parties, so as to provide a stable government for the province.  Willis rejected the offer the same day, claiming his caucus was unwilling to accept it.

The provincial impasse continued until August 13, when the Social Credit League unexpectedly announced that it would provide support to Bracken's government in the legislature.  Social Credit did not formally join with the Liberal-Progressives in a coalition government, but provided critical support to Bracken's minority government for the next four years.

Ironically, Bracken's own constituency of The Pas was the site of one of the two deferred elections.  He was re-elected, while a second Independent Liberal was returned in Rupertsland.

Including the Social Credit MLAs, Bracken's government could count on the support of only 28 members out of 55.  He was nonetheless able to keep his government intact for four years, and in late 1940 formed a new wartime coalition government with the Conservatives, CCF and Social Credit.  This coalition contested the 1941 election, and won a landslide majority.

The Communist Party was not included in this coalition, as it had been declared illegal after the start of World War II.  James Litterick was expelled from the legislature in 1940 and went into hiding. He and CPC leader Tim Buck surrendered themselves to police in 1942 and spent time in the Don Jail, being released in 1942 or 1943. Litterick's whereabouts after the war are unknown. His disappearance has been the cause of speculation in the Canadian left.  Some say that he was a spy for the Royal Canadian Mounted Police, and that he was killed as a traitor during the war by other members of the Communist Party.  This has never been verified, however.

Like the previous Manitoba elections, all the voters cast preferential votes. Ten MLAs were elected in Winnipeg through Single transferable votes; all others were elected through Instant-runoff voting.

Results

Results by riding
Bold names indicate members returned by acclamation. Incumbents are marked with *.

Turnover on runoff

Among the single-member ridings, there was only one case where the first-place candidate in first-preference votes failed to win:

|-
! rowspan="2" colspan="2"|Party
! rowspan="2"|Candidate
! colspan="2"|First-preference votes
! colspan="3"|Maximum votes
|- style="text-align:right; background-color:#E9E9E9; text-align:center"
! Votes
! % 
! Votes
! Round
! Initial vs transfer votes mix

| style="text-align:left;" |L.P. Gagnon
| 3,630
| 32.22
| 4,235
| 3
| style="text-align:left;" |

| style="text-align:left;" |Independent Labour
| style="text-align:left;" |Harold Lawrence*
| 3,157
| 28.03
| 4,620
| 3
| style="text-align:left;" |

| style="text-align:left;" |G.C. McLean
| 2,747
| 24.39
| 2,890
| 2
| style="text-align:left;" |

| style="text-align:left;" |J.F. Jodoin
| 1,730
| 15.36
| 1,730
| 1
| style="text-align:left;" |
|-
| colspan="3" style="text-align:left;" |Total
|11,264
|100.00
|colspan="3"|  
|-
| colspan="5" style="text-align:left;" |Exhausted votes
|2,409
|21.39%
| style="text-align:left;" |
|}

Winnipeg
Winnipeg:

Ten MLAs were elected through Single transferable vote.

* - Incumbent

{| style="width:100%;"
|-
|

Sources

The first ballot results for Winnipeg and results for all other constituencies are taken from an official Manitoba government publication entitled "Manitoba elections, 1920-1941", cross-referenced with an appendix to the government's report of the 2003 provincial election. The Canadian parliamentary guide lists slightly different results for Glenwood, but the other two sources are more comprehensive and may be taken as more reliable.

All ballot results for Winnipeg after the first count are taken from reports in the Winnipeg Free Press newspaper. It is possible that some errors appeared in the original publication.

Post-election changes

The ILP-CCF parliamentary group became known as CCF after the election.

Winnipeg (dec. Marcus Hyman, 1938).

Winnipeg (James Litterick disqualified from the legislature, 1940).

Lewis Stubbs was initially the only member of the legislature to remain in opposition when a four-party coalition was formed in 1940.  He was later joined by Salome Halldorson of Social Credit, as well as John Poole and Huntly Ketchen of the Conservatives.

Further reading
 

1936 elections in Canada
1936
1936 in Manitoba